pabulum: word; "denoting material for intellectual nourishment; food for thought;"
 Pablum: product; infant cereal from Mead Johnson; Used in botany and medicine to refer to nutrition or substances of which nutritive elements are absorbed passively; product name derived from pabulum above